Hai (Ukrainian: Гаї) is a village in Zolochiv Raion of Lviv Oblast, Ukraine. It belongs to Brody urban hromada, one of the hromadas of Ukraine. Population is 655. Postal code is 80650.

Until 18 July 2020, Hai belonged to Brody Raion. The raion was abolished in July 2020 as part of the administrative reform of Ukraine, which reduced the number of raions of Lviv Oblast to seven. The area of Brody Raion was merged into Zolochiv Raion.

References

External links
 Hai village

Villages in Zolochiv Raion, Lviv Oblast